Valentín Lamas Carvajal (1849–1906) was a Spanish journalist. He was one of the founders of Royal Galician Academy.

He studied high school in his hometown and in 1870 he moved to Santiago de Compostela to study medicine that he failed to finish due to an eye disease that would eventually leave him blind.

Work
Espiñas, follas e frores (1875)
Saudades gallegas (1880)
Gallegada (1887)
Catecismo do labrego  (1889)
A musa das aldeas (1890)

External links

 
 
 

1849 births
1906 deaths
Writers from Galicia (Spain)
Spanish journalists
Galician-language writers
Blind writers
Blind academics
Spanish blind people